The 1996 Summer Olympics (officially the Games of the XXVI Olympiad, also known as Atlanta 1996 and commonly referred to as the Centennial Olympic Games) were an international multi-sport event held from July 19 to August 4, 1996, in Atlanta, Georgia, United States. These were the fourth Summer Olympics to be hosted by the United States, and marked the centennial of the 1896 Summer Olympics in Athens, the inaugural edition of the modern Olympic Games. These were also the first Summer Olympics since 1924 to be held in a different year than the Winter Olympics, as part of a new IOC practice implemented in 1994 to hold the Summer and Winter Games in alternating, even-numbered years. The 1996 Games were the first of the two consecutive Summer Olympics to be held in a predominantly English-speaking country preceding the 2000 Summer Olympics in Sydney, Australia. These were also the last Summer Olympics to be held in North America until 2028, when Los Angeles will host the games for the third time.

10,320 athletes from 197 National Olympic Committees competed in 26 sports, including the Olympic debuts of beach volleyball, mountain biking and softball, as well as the new disciplines of lightweight rowing, women's swimming, women's fencing, team rhythmic gymnastics, and women's association football. A total of 24 countries made their Summer Olympic debuts in Atlanta, including 11 former Soviet republics participating for the first time as independent nations. With a total of 101 medals, the United States topped the medal table for the first time since 1984 (and for the first time since 1968 in a non-boycotted Summer Olympics), also winning the most gold (44) and silver (32) medals out of all the participating nations. Notable performances during the competition included those of Andre Agassi, whose gold medal in these Games would be followed up with the French Open title in 1999, making him the first men's singles tennis player to complete the Golden Slam; Donovan Bailey, who set a new world record of 9.84 for the men's 100 metres; Lilia Podkopayeva, who became the second gymnast to win an individual event gold medal after winning the all-around title in the same Olympics; and the Magnificent Seven, who dramatically won the first ever U.S. gold medal in the Women's artistic gymnastics team all-around.

The Games were marred by violence on July 27, 1996, when a pipe bomb was detonated at Centennial Olympic Park (which had been built to serve as a public focal point for the festivities), killing two and injuring 111. Years later, Eric Rudolph confessed to the bombing and a series of related terrorist attacks, and was sentenced to life in prison. Nonetheless, the 1996 Olympics turned a profit, helped by record revenue from sponsorship deals and broadcast rights, and a reliance on private funding, among other factors. There was some criticism of the apparent over-commercialization of the Games, with other issues raised by European officials, such as the availability of food and transport. The event had a lasting impact on the city; Centennial Olympic Park led a revitalization of Atlanta's downtown area, and has served as a symbol of the legacy of the 1996 Games; the Olympic Village buildings have since been used as residential housing for area universities; and the Centennial Olympic Stadium has since been redeveloped twice, first as the Turner Field baseball stadium, then as the Center Parc college football stadium.

Bidding process

Atlanta was selected on September 18, 1990, in Tokyo, Japan, over Athens, Belgrade, Manchester, Melbourne, and Toronto at the 96th IOC Session. The city entered the competition as a dark horse, being up against stiff competition. The US media also criticized it as a second-tier city and complained of Georgia's Confederate history. However, the IOC Evaluation Commission ranked Atlanta's infrastructure and facilities the highest, while IOC members said that it could guarantee large television revenues similar to the success of the 1984 Summer Olympics in Los Angeles, the most recent Olympics in the United States. Additionally, former US ambassador to the UN and Atlanta mayor Andrew Jackson Young touted Atlanta's civil rights history and reputation for racial harmony. Young also wanted to showcase a reformed American South. The strong economy of Atlanta and improved race relations in the South helped to impress the IOC officials. The Atlanta Committee for the Olympic Games (ACOG) also proposed a substantial revenue-sharing with the IOC, USOC, and other NOCs. Atlanta's main rivals were Toronto, whose front-running bid that began in 1986 had chances to succeed after Canada had held a successful 1988 Winter Olympics in Calgary, and Melbourne, Australia, who hosted the 1956 Summer Olympics and after Brisbane, Australia's failed bid for the 1992 games (which were awarded to Barcelona) and prior to Sydney, Australia's successful 2000 Summer Olympics bid. This would be Toronto's fourth failed attempt since 1960 (tried in 1960, 1964, and 1976, but defeated by Rome, Tokyo and Montreal).

Greece, the home of the ancient and first modern Olympics, was considered by many observers the "natural choice" for the Centennial Games. However, Athens bid chairman Spyros Metaxa demanded that it be named as the site of the Olympics because of its "historical right due to its history", which may have caused resentment among delegates. Furthermore, the Athens bid was described as "arrogant and poorly prepared", being regarded as "not being up to the task of coping with the modern and risk-prone extravaganza" of the current Games. Athens faced numerous obstacles, including "political instability, potential security problems, air pollution, traffic congestion and the fact that it would have to spend about US$3 billion to improve its infrastructure of airports, roads, rail lines and other amenities". Athens would later be selected to host the 2004 Summer Olympics seven years later on September 5, 1997.

Development and preparation

Budget
The total cost of the 1996 Summer Olympics was estimated to be around US$1.7 billion. The venues and the Games themselves were funded entirely via private investment, and the only public funding came from the U.S. government for security, and around $500 million of public money used on physical public infrastructure including streetscaping, road improvements, Centennial Olympic Park (alongside $75 million in private funding), expansion of the airport, improvements in public transportation, and redevelopment of public housing projects. $420 million worth of tickets were sold, sale of sponsorship rights accounted for $540 million, and sale of the domestic broadcast rights to NBC accounted for $456 million. In total, the Games turned a profit of $19 million.

The cost for Atlanta 1996 compares with costs of $4.6 billion for Rio 2016, $40–44 billion for Beijing 2008, and $51 billion for Sochi 2014 (the most expensive Olympics in history). The average cost for the Summer Games since 1960 is $5.2 billion. Unlike Atlanta 1996, Beijing and Sochi were primarily funded by their respective governments.

Venues and infrastructure

Events of the 1996 Games were held in a variety of areas. A number were held within the Olympic Ring, a  circle from the center of Atlanta. Others were held at Stone Mountain, about  outside of the city. To broaden ticket sales, other events, such as Association football (soccer), were staged in various cities in the Southeast.

Alexander Memorial Coliseum – Boxing
Atlanta–Fulton County Stadium – Baseball
Centennial Olympic Stadium – Opening/Closing Ceremonies, Athletics
Clayton County International Park (Jonesboro, Georgia) – Beach Volleyball
Forbes Arena – Basketball
Georgia Dome – Basketball (final), Gymnastics (artistic), Handball (men's final)
Georgia International Horse Park (Conyers, Georgia) – Cycling (mountain), Equestrian, Modern pentathlon (riding, running)
Georgia State University Sports Arena – Badminton
Georgia Tech Aquatic Center – Diving, Modern pentathlon (swimming), Swimming, Synchronized Swimming, Water Polo
Georgia World Congress Center – Fencing, Handball, Judo, Modern pentathlon (fencing, shooting), Table Tennis, Weightlifting, Wrestling
Golden Park (Columbus, Georgia) – Softball
Herndon Stadium – Field hockey (final)
Lake Lanier (Gainesville, Georgia) – Canoeing (sprint), Rowing
Legion Field (Birmingham, Alabama) – Football
Miami Orange Bowl (Miami, Florida) – Football
Omni Coliseum – Volleyball (indoor final)
Ocoee Whitewater Center (Polk County, Tennessee) – Canoeing (slalom)
Panther Stadium – Field hockey
RFK Stadium (Washington, D.C.) – Football
Stone Mountain Tennis Center (Stone Mountain, Georgia) – Tennis
Stone Mountain Park Archery Center (Stone Mountain, Georgia) – Archery
Stone Mountain Park Velodrome (Stone Mountain, Georgia) – Cycling (track)
Sanford Stadium (Athens, Georgia) at the University of Georgia – Football (final)
Stegeman Coliseum (Athens, Georgia) at the University of Georgia – Gymnastics (rhythmic), Volleyball (indoor)
Wassaw Sound (Savannah, Georgia) – Sailing
Wolf Creek Shooting Complex – Shooting

Marketing
The Olympiad's official theme, "Summon the Heroes", was written by John Williams, making it the third Olympiad at that point for which he had composed (official composer 1984; NBC's coverage composer 1988). The opening ceremony featured Céline Dion singing "The Power of the Dream", the theme song of the 1996 Olympics. The closing ceremony featured Gloria Estefan  singing "Reach", the official theme song of the 1996 Olympics. The mascot for the Olympiad was an abstract, animated character named Izzy. In contrast to the standing tradition of mascots of national or regional significance in the city hosting the Olympiad, Izzy was an amorphous, fantasy figure. Atlanta's Olympic slogan "Come Celebrate Our Dream" was written by Jack Arogeti, a Managing Director at McCann-Erickson in Atlanta at the time. The slogan was selected from more than 5,000 submitted by the public to the Atlanta Convention and Visitors Bureau. Billy Payne noted that Jack "captured the spirit and our true motivation for the Olympic games."

The city of Savannah, Georgia, host of the yachting events, held its own local festivities, including a local cauldron lighting event on the first day of the Games (headlined by a performance by country musician Trisha Yearwood).

The syndicated game show Wheel of Fortune taped three weeks of Olympics-themed episodes from the Fox Theater in Atlanta for broadcast in April, May and July 1996, which included prizes from the Games' official sponsors. A video game featuring the Games' mascot, Izzy's Quest for the Olympic Rings, was also released.

In 1994, African-American artist Kevin Cole was commissioned to create the Coca-Cola Centennial Olympic Mural, and the 15-story mural took two years to complete.

Calendar

Games

Opening ceremony

The ceremony began with a 60-second countdown, which included footage from all of the previous Olympic Games at twenty-two seconds. There was then a flashback to the closing ceremony of the 1992 Olympics in Barcelona, showing the then president of the IOC, Juan Antonio Samaranch, inviting the athletes to compete in Atlanta in 1996. Then, spirits ascended in the northwest corner of the stadium, each representing one of the colors in the Olympic rings. The spirits called the tribes of the world which, after mixed percussion, formed the Olympic rings while the youth of Atlanta formed the number 100. Famed film score composer John Williams wrote the official overture for the 1996 Olympics, called "Summon the Heroes"; this was his second overture for Olympic games, the first being "Olympic Fanfare and Theme" written for the 1984 Summer Olympics. Céline Dion performed David Foster's official 1996 Olympics song "The Power of the Dream", accompanied by Foster on the piano, the Atlanta Symphony Orchestra and the Centennial Choir (comprising Morehouse College Glee Club, Spelman College Glee Club and the Atlanta Symphony Orchestra Chorus). Gladys Knight sang Georgia's official state song "Georgia on My Mind"

There was a showcase entitled "Welcome To The World", featuring cheerleaders, Chevrolet pick-up trucks, marching bands, and steppers, which highlighted the American youth and a typical Saturday college football game in the South, including the wave commonly produced by spectators in sporting events around the world. There was another showcase entitled "Summertime" which focused on Atlanta and the Old South, emphasizing its beauty, spirit, music, history, culture, and rebirth after the American Civil War. The ceremony also featured a memorable dance tribute to the athletes and to the goddesses of victory of the ancient Greek Olympics, using silhouette imagery. The accompanying music, "The Tradition of the Games", was composed by Basil Poledouris.

Muhammad Ali lit the Olympic cauldron and later received a replacement gold medal for his boxing victory in the 1960 Summer Olympics. For the torch ceremony, more than 10,000 Olympic torches were manufactured by the American Meter Company and electroplated by Erie Plating Company.

Closing ceremony

Sports

The 1996 Summer Olympic programme featured 271 events in 26 sports. Softball, beach volleyball and mountain biking debuted on the Olympic program, together with women's football, lightweight rowing, women's swimming, women's fencing, and a team rhythmic gymnastics event.

In women's gymnastics, Ukrainian Lilia Podkopayeva became the all-around Olympic champion. Podkopayeva also won a second gold medal in the floor exercise final and a silver on the beam – becoming the only female gymnast since Nadia Comăneci to win an individual event gold after winning the all-around title in the same Olympics. Kerri Strug of the United States women's gymnastics team vaulted with an injured ankle and landed on one foot, winning the first women's team gold medal for the US. Shannon Miller won the gold medal on the balance beam event, the first time an American gymnast had won an individual gold medal in non-boycotted Olympic games. The Spanish team won the first gold medal in the new competition of women's rhythmic group all-around. The team was formed by Estela Giménez, Marta Baldó, Nuria Cabanillas, Lorena Guréndez, Estíbaliz Martínez and Tania Lamarca.

Amy Van Dyken won four gold medals in the Olympic swimming pool, the first American woman to win four titles in a single Olympiad. Penny Heyns, swimmer of South Africa, won the gold medals in both the 100 metres and 200 metres breaststroke events. Michelle Smith of Ireland won three gold medals and a bronze in swimming. She remains her nation's most decorated Olympian. However, her victories were overshadowed by doping allegations even though she did not test positive in 1996. She received a four-year suspension in 1998 for tampering with a urine sample, though her medals and records were allowed to stand.

In track and field, Donovan Bailey of Canada won the men's 100 m, setting a new world record of 9.84 seconds at that time. He also anchored his team's gold in the 4 × 100 m relay.
Michael Johnson won gold in both the 200 m and 400 m, setting a new world record of 19.32 seconds in the 200 m. Marie-José Pérec equaled Johnson's performance, although without a world record, by winning the rare 200 m/400 m double. Carl Lewis won his 4th long jump gold medal at the age of 35.

In tennis, Andre Agassi won the gold medal, which would eventually make him the first man and second singles player overall (after his eventual wife, Steffi Graf) to win the career Golden Slam, which consists of an Olympic gold medal and victories in the singles tournaments held at professional tennis' four major events (Australian Open, French Open, Wimbledon, and US Open).

There were a series of national firsts realized during the Games. Deon Hemmings became the first woman to win an Olympic gold medal for Jamaica and the English-speaking West Indies. Lee Lai Shan won a gold medal in sailing, the only Olympic medal that Hong Kong ever won as a British colony (1842–1997). This meant that for the only time, the colonial flag of Hong Kong was raised to the accompaniment of the British national anthem "God Save the Queen", as Hong Kong's sovereignty was later transferred to China in 1997. The US women's soccer team won the gold medal in the first-ever women's football event. For the first time, Olympic medals were won by athletes from Armenia, Azerbaijan, Belarus, Burundi, Ecuador, Georgia, Hong Kong, Kazakhstan, Moldova, Mozambique, Slovakia, Tonga, Ukraine, and Uzbekistan. Another first in Atlanta was that this was the first Summer Olympics ever that not a single nation swept all three medals in a single event.

Records

Medal count

These are the top ten nations that won medals at the 1996 Games.

Participating National Olympic Committees

A total of 197 nations, all of the then-existing and recognized National Olympic Committees, were represented at the 1996 Games, and the combined total of athletes was about 10,318. Twenty-four countries made their Olympic debut this year, including eleven of the ex-Soviet countries that competed as part of the Unified Team in 1992. Russia participated in the Summer Olympics separately from the other countries of the former Soviet Union for the first time since 1912 (when it was the Russian Empire). Russia had been a member of the Unified Team at the 1992 Summer Olympics together with 11 post-Soviet states. The Federal Republic of Yugoslavia competed as Yugoslavia.

The 14 countries making their Olympic debut were: Azerbaijan, Burundi, Cape Verde, Comoros, Dominica, Guinea-Bissau, Macedonia, Nauru, Palestinian Authority, Saint Kitts and Nevis, Saint Lucia, São Tomé and Príncipe, Tajikistan and Turkmenistan. The ten countries making their Summer Olympic debut (after competing at the 1994 Winter Olympics in Lillehammer) were: Armenia, Belarus, Czech Republic, Georgia, Kazakhstan, Kyrgyzstan, Moldova, Slovakia, Ukraine and Uzbekistan. The Czech Republic and Slovakia attended the games as independent nations for the first time since the breakup of Czechoslovakia, while the rest of the nations that made their Summer Olympic debut were formerly part of the Soviet Union.

Centennial Olympic Park bombing

The 1996 Olympics were marred by the Centennial Olympic Park bombing, which occurred on July 27. Security guard Richard Jewell discovered the pipe bomb and immediately notified law enforcement, helping to evacuate as many people as possible from the area before it exploded. Although Jewell's quick actions are credited for saving many lives, the bombing killed spectator Alice Hawthorne, wounded 111 others, and caused the death of Melih Uzunyol by a heart attack. Jewell was later considered a suspect in the bombing but was never charged, and he was cleared in October 1996.

Fugitive Eric Rudolph was arrested in May 2003 and charged with the Olympic Park bombing as well as the bombings of two abortion clinics and a gay nightclub. At his trial two years later, he confessed to all charges and afterwards released a statement, saying: "the purpose of the attack on July 27th was to confound, anger and embarrass the Washington government in the eyes of the world for its abominable sanctioning of abortion on demand." He received four life sentences without parole, to be served at USP Florence ADMAX near Florence, Colorado.

Legacy
 

Preparations for the Olympics lasted more than seven years and had an economic impact of at least US$5.14 billion. Over two million visitors came to Atlanta, and approximately 3.5 billion people around the world watched at least some of the events on television. Although marred by the tragedy of the Centennial Olympic Park bombing, the Games were a financial success, due in part to TV rights contracts and sponsorships at record levels.

Beyond international recognition, the Games resulted in many modern infrastructure improvements. The mid-rise dormitories built for the Olympic Village, which became the first residential housing for Georgia State University (Georgia State Village), are now used by the Georgia Institute of Technology (North Avenue Apartments). As designed, the Centennial Olympic Stadium was converted into Turner Field after the Paralympics, which became the home of the Atlanta Braves Major League Baseball team from 1997 to 2016. The Braves' former home, Atlanta–Fulton County Stadium, was demolished in 1997 and the site became a parking lot for Turner Field; the Omni Coliseum was demolished the same year to make way for State Farm Arena. The city's permanent memorial to the 1996 Olympics is Centennial Olympic Park, which was built as a focal point for the Games. The park initiated a revitalization of the surrounding area and now serves as the hub for Atlanta's tourism district.

In November 2016, a commemorative plaque was unveiled for Centennial Olympic Park to honor the 20th anniversary of the Games.

Following the Braves' departure from Turner Field to Truist Park, Georgia State University acquired the former Olympic Stadium and surrounding parking lots. It reconfigured the stadium for a second time into Center Parc Stadium for its college football team.

The 1996 Olympic cauldron was originally built and placed at the intersection of Fulton Street and Capitol Avenue, near the Centennial Olympic Stadium. After the Paralympics, as well as to make room for the stadium conversion, the Olympic cauldron was moved (except its ramp, which was demolished) to the intersection of Capitol Avenue and Fulton Street in 1997, where it has stayed since. The Olympic cauldron was re-lit in February 2020 for the 2020 U.S. Olympic Marathon Trials.

The 1996 Olympics are the most recent edition of the Summer Olympics to be held in the United States. Los Angeles will host the 2028 Summer Olympics, 32 years after the Games were held in Atlanta.

Sponsors
The 1996 Summer Olympics relied heavily on commercial sponsorship. The Atlanta-based Coca-Cola Company was the exclusive provider of soft drinks at Olympics venues and built an attraction known as Coca-Cola Olympic City for the Games.

The Games were affected by several instances of ambush marketing—in which companies attempt to use the Games as a means to promote their brand, in competition with the exclusive, category-based sponsorship rights issued by the Atlanta organizing committee and the IOC (which grants the rights to use Olympics-related terms and emblems in marketing). The Atlanta organizing committee threatened legal actions against advertisers whose marketing implied an official association with the Games. Several non-sponsors set up marketing activities in areas near venues, such as Samsung (competing with Motorola), which ambushed the Games with its "'96 Expo". The city of Atlanta had also licensed street vendors to sell products from competitors to Olympic sponsors.

The most controversial ambush campaign was undertaken by Nike, Inc., which had begun an advertising campaign with aggressive slogans that mocked the Games' values, such as "Faster, Higher, Stronger, Badder", "If you're not here to win, you're a tourist", and "You don't win silver, you lose gold." The slogans were featured on magazine ads and billboards it purchased in Atlanta. Nike also opened a pop-up store known as the Nike Center near the Athletes' Village, which distributed Nike-branded flags to visitors (presumably to be used at events). IOC marketing director Michael Payne expressed concern for the campaign, believing that athletes could perceive them as being an insult to their accomplishments. Payne and the United States Olympic Committee's marketing director, John Krimsky, met with Howard Slusher, a subordinate of Nike co-founder Phil Knight. The meeting quickly turned aggressive, with Payne warning that the IOC could pull accreditation for Nike employees and ban the display of its logos on equipment; he also threatened to organize a press conference where silver medallists from the Games, as well as prominent Nike-sponsored athlete Michael Johnson (who attracted attention during the Games for wearing custom, gold-colored Nike shoes), would denounce the company. Faced with these threats, Nike agreed to retract most of its negative advertising and PR stunts.

The popular U.S. game shows Wheel of Fortune and Jeopardy! were also official sponsors, and both aired Olympic-themed episodes during 1996.

Reception
At the closing ceremony, IOC President Juan Antonio Samaranch said in his closing speech, "Well done, Atlanta" and simply called the Games "most exceptional." This broke precedent for Samaranch, who had traditionally labeled each Games "the best Olympics ever" at each closing ceremony, a practice he resumed at the subsequent Winter Games in Nagano in 1998.

A report prepared after the Games by European Olympic officials was critical of Atlanta's performance in several key areas, including the level of crowding in the Olympic Village, the quality of available food, the accessibility and convenience of transportation, and the Games' general atmosphere of commercialism. IOC vice-president Dick Pound responded to criticism of the commercialization of these Games, stating that they still adhered to a historic policy barring the display of advertising within venues, and that "you have to look to the private sector for at least a portion of the funding, and unless you're looking for handouts, you're dealing with people who are investing business assets, and they have to get a return."

In 1997, Athens, Greece was awarded the 2004 Summer Olympics. Along with addressing the shortcomings of its 1996 bid, it was lauded for its efforts to promote the traditional values of the Olympic Games, which some IOC observers felt had been lost due to the over-commercialization of the 1996 Games. However, the 2004 Games heavily relied on public funding and eventually failed to make a profit, which some have claimed contributed to the financial crisis in Greece.

The financial struggles faced by many later Games, such as the 2006 Winter Olympics in Turin, Italy and later the 2016 Summer Olympics in Rio de Janeiro, Brazil have led later to more positive re-appraisals of the management of the 1996 Summer Games. Former JPMorgan Chase president (and torchbearer) Kabir Sehgal noted that in contrast to many later Games, the 1996 Summer Olympics were financially viable, had a positive economic impact on the city, and most of the facilities constructed for the Games still see use in the present day. Sehgal contrasted the 1996 Games' "grassroots" effort backed almost entirely by private funding, with the only significant public spending coming from infrastructure associated with the Games, to modern "top-down" bids, instigated by local governments and reliant on taxpayer funding, making them unpopular among citizens who may not necessarily be interested.

See also

Use of performance-enhancing drugs in the Olympic Games – 1996 Atlanta

References

External links

Official Report of the Centennial Olympic Games, Volume I: Planning and Organizing Digital Archive from the LA84 Foundation of Los Angeles
Official Report of the Centennial Olympic Games, Volume II: The Centennial Olympic Games Digital Archive from the LA84 Foundation of Los Angeles
Official Report of the Centennial Olympic Games, Volume III: The Competition Results Digital Archive from the LA84 Foundation of Los Angeles
1996 program from GPB about Atlanta and the 1996 Olympic Games, "Fences & Neighborhoods," 1996-06-07, The Walter J. Brown Media Archives & Peabody Awards Collection at the University of Georgia, American Archive of Public Broadcasting
Atlanta Summer Games 25th anniversary Coverage from The Atlanta Journal-Constitution

 
Summer Olympics by year
Olympic Games in the United States
Sports competitions in Atlanta
1996 in Atlanta
Olympics
Olympics
Olympics
July 1996 sports events in the United States
Summer Olympics
Olympic Games in Georgia (U.S. state)